Furculești is a commune in Teleorman County, Muntenia, Romania. It is composed of four villages: Furculești, Moșteni, Spătărei and Voievoda.

Natives
 Gheorghe Băgulescu (1886–1963), brigadier general in World War II

References

Communes in Teleorman County
Localities in Muntenia